Shahin Akhtar is a Bangladesh Awami League politician and the incumbent Member of Parliament of Cox's Bazar-4.

Career
Akhtar was elected to parliament from Cox's Bazar-4 as a Bangladesh Awami League candidate on 30 December 2018. She is married to Abdur Rahman Bodi, the previous member of parliament from Cox's Bazar-4.

References

Awami League politicians
Living people
11th Jatiya Sangsad members
1976 births